Samsonite International S.A. is a luggage manufacturer and retailer, with products ranging from large suitcases to small toiletries bags and briefcases. The company was founded in Denver, Colorado, United States.  
Its registered office is in Luxembourg and it is listed on the Hong Kong Stock Exchange.

History

1910 - 2001 
The company was founded in Denver, Colorado, on March 10, 1910 by Black Hawk, Colorado-born luggage salesman Jesse Shwayder (1882–1970) as the Shwayder Trunk Manufacturing Company. A religious man, Shwayder named one of his initial cases Samson, after the Biblical strongman, and began using the trademark Samsonite in 1941 for its tapered vulcanized fiber suitcase, introduced in 1939. In 1965, after the Samsonite suitcase became its best-selling product, the company changed its name to SAMSONITE. For many years the subsidiary SAMSONITE Furniture Co. made folding chairs and card tables in Murfreesboro, Tennessee.

The Shwayder family sold the company to Beatrice Foods in 1973. In 1974, the company released the brand's first wheeled suitcase. Samsonite operated with relative independence within Beatrice until 1986, when the company was sold to Kohlberg Kravis Roberts. Subsequently, the company went through multiple changes of ownership in the 1980s and into the 1990s. First, Samsonite was spun off from KKR as part of E-II, which came under the control of American Brands. E-II went through bankruptcy and was renamed Astrum International. In 1993, Astrum purchased American Tourister luggage, complementing Samsonite. In 1995, Astrum split, and an independent Samsonite (now including American Tourister) was once again headquartered in Denver.

2001 - 2010 
The Denver factory, which employed 4,000 at its peak, closed in May 2001.  Samsonite headquarters moved from Denver to Mansfield, Massachusetts, after a change of ownership in May 2005.

Samsonite moved its US marketing and sales offices from 91 Main Street in Warren, Rhode Island, to Mansfield, Massachusetts, effective September 1, 2005.

In 2005, the company was acquired by Marcello Bottoli, former CEO of Louis Vuitton, to pull them out of a long slump. Bottoli left the company in 2009.

In July 2007, finance investor CVC Capital Partners took over Samsonite for $1.7 billion.  CVC Capital Partners Ltd. became Samsonite's fifth owner in 21 years.

On September 2, 2009, Samsonite Company Store LLC (U.S. Retail Division), formally known as Samsonite Company Stores Inc, filed Chapter 11 bankruptcy. It planned to close up to 50% of its stores and discontinue the "Black Label" brand in the United States.

2011 - Present 
In June 2011, Samsonite raised US$1.25 billion in an initial public offering in Hong Kong.

In August 2012 Samsonite paid $35 million in cash to buy the high-end luggage brand Hartmann, which was founded in 1877.

In June 2014, Samsonite agreed to buy technical outdoor backpack brand Gregory Mountain Products from Black Diamond, Inc., for US$85.0 million in cash.

In March 2016, Samsonite agreed to buy luxury baggage maker Tumi for $1.8 billion in its largest ever acquisition.

In April 2017, Samsonite agreed to acquire eBags for $105 million in cash. eBags generated $158.5 million in sales in 2016, up 23.5% from $128.3 million in 2015.

Entry into the toy market 
Beginning in 1961, Samsonite manufactured and distributed Lego building toys for the North American market under license from the Danish parent firm. A licensing dispute ended the arrangement in the U.S. in 1972, but Samsonite remained the distributor in Canada until 1986. Albert H. Reckler, then head of Military and export sales for the luggage division, brought the idea of manufacturing and selling Lego in the U.S. to Samsonite.  He and Stan A. Clamage were instrumental in establishing the Lego brand in the United States. This was part of an overall company expansion into toy manufacturing in the 1960s that was abandoned in the 1970s.

Production 
Forty percent of all Samsonite hard luggage is manufactured at its plant in Nashik, India. Samsonite has two assembly plants in Hungary.
Samsonite currently has a Better Business Organization rating of 'F', primarily because of Customer Service.

Brands

 American Tourister
 eBags
 Gregory Mountain Product
 Hartmann Luggage
 High Sierra
 Kamiliant
 Lipault
 Samsonite
 Tumi Inc.

Competitors
 Delsey
 Red Oxx Manufacturing
 VIP Industries

References

External links 

 
Companies listed on the Hong Kong Stock Exchange
Luggage brands
Companies based in Bristol County, Massachusetts
Mansfield, Massachusetts
Manufacturing companies established in 1910
Companies that filed for Chapter 11 bankruptcy in 2009
1910 establishments in Colorado
Luggage manufacturers
2011 initial public offerings